Opsariichthys minutus is a species of cyprinid in the genus Opsariichthys.

References

Cyprinid fish of Asia
Freshwater fish of China
Taxa named by John Treadwell Nichols
Fish described in 1926